QANDA (stands for 'Q and A') is an AI-based learning platform developed by Mathpresso Inc., a South Korea-based education technology company. It uses optical character recognition technology to scan math problems and provide step-by-step solutions. 

As of 2021, QANDA has reached no.1 on the education charts in 20 countries, including Japan, Vietnam, Indonesia, and Thailand. QANDA also established global offices in Japan, Vietnam and Indonesia.

As of December 2022, QANDA solved over 4.7 billion questions. QANDA has 75 million total registered users and reached 13 million monthly active users (MAU) in 50 countries. 87% of the cumulative users are from overseas such as Vietnam and Indonesia.

History 
Co-Founder Jongheun ‘Ray’ Lee first came up with the idea of QANDA during his freshman year in college. While he was tutoring to earn money, Lee realized that the quality of education a student receives is greatly based on their location. Lee saw his K-12 students were regularly asking similar questions and realized that these questions are from a pre-selected number of textbooks currently being used in schools. He decided to team up with his high school friend, Yongjae ‘Jake’ Lee to build a platform whereby way of using a mobile app to scan and submit questions, students can ask and receive detailed responses. Lee's school friends, Wonguk Jung and Hojae Jeong, joined the team.

In June 2015, Mathpresso, Inc. was founded in Seoul, South Korea. 

In January 2016, Mathpresso's first product QANDA was launched. It supported a Q&A feature between students and tutors.

In October 2017, QANDA introduced an AI-based search capability that permitted users to search for answers in seconds.

In June 2021, QANDA raised $50 million in series C funding.

In November 2021, QANDA secured a strategic investment from Google.

Since its inception, it got its backing in Series C funding from investors namely Google, Yellowdog, GGV Capital, Goodwater Capital, KDB, and SKS Private Equity with participation from SoftBank Ventures Asia, Legend Capital, Mirae Asset Venture Investment, and Smilegate Investment. The total cumulative investment is about 122 million dollars.

Features 
QANDA features OCR-based solution search, one-on-one Q&A tutoring, a study timer. 

In 2021, QANDA launched additional features, including the premium subscription model that offers unlimited “byte-sized” micro-video lectures and the community feature that enhances collaborative learning.

In 2021, QANDA launched QANDA Tutor, a tablet-based 1:1 tutoring service.

In 2022, QANDA launched an exam prep feature that offers past exam materials from school via online. This feature is currently available in South Korea.

Awards and recognition 

 Best Hidden Gems of 2017 by Google Playstore
 2018 AWS AI Startup Challenge Award
 National representative for the Google AI for Social Good APAC, 2018
 Best Self-Improvement Apps of 2018 by Google Playstore
GSV Edtech 150 — the Most Transformational Growth Companies in Digital Learning
Speaker at the Google App Summit, 2021

References

External links 

 Mathpresso Official Website
 QANDA Official website

Mobile applications
Companies based in Seoul

Optical character recognition

Educational technology companies
Educational technology
Applications of artificial intelligence
IOS software
Android (operating system) software